Gallipoli is a peninsula in northwestern Turkey.

Gallipoli may also refer to:

Places
 Gallipoli, Apulia, a town in Italy
 Gelibolu, also known as Gallipoli, a town and a district of Gallipoli peninsula, Turkey
 Gallipoli Drive, a road which intersects Grand Junction Road, Adelaide 
 Gallipoli Underpass, a part of South Road, Adelaide

Arts and entertainment

Film and television
 Gallipoli (1981 film), about the Gallipoli campaign, directed by Peter Weir
 Gallipoli (2005 film), about the Gallipoli campaign, written and directed by Tolga Örnek
 Gallipoli (miniseries), a 2015 miniseries based on Les Carlyon's book

Literature
 Gallipoli, a book by Les Carlyon about the Gallipoli campaign, which was adapted as an Australian TV miniseries
 Gallipoli, a book by John Masefield about the Gallipoli campaign
 Gallipoli, a book by Alan Moorehead about the Gallipoli campaign

Music
 Gallipoli (album), a 2019 album by Beirut
 "Gallipoli" (song), the title track of the album

Other uses
 Gallipoli campaign or Battle of Gallipoli, which took place on the Gallipoli peninsula during World War I
 A.S.D. Gallipoli Football 1909, a football team based in Gallipoli, Apulia
 Gallipoli Art Prize, an Australian prize

See also 
 Callipolis (disambiguation)
 Gallipolis